Aladár von Farkas (20 October 1874 – 20 May 1949) was a Hungarian sports shooter. He competed in four events at the 1912 Summer Olympics.

References

1874 births
1949 deaths
Hungarian male sport shooters
Olympic shooters of Hungary
Shooters at the 1912 Summer Olympics